The 2009 FC Rostov season was the club's first season back in the Russian Premier League, the highest tier of football in Russia, following their relegation at the end of the 2007 season.

Season events

New Contracts
On 1 October, Dušan Anđelković signed a new three-year contract with Rostov.

Squad

Out on loan

Transfers

In

Loans in

Loans out

Released

Trial

Competitions

Overview

Premier League

Results by round

Results

League table

Russian Cup

2009-10

Squad statistics

Appearances and goals

|-
|colspan="14"|Players away from the club on loan:
|-
|colspan="14"|Players who left Rostov during the season:

|}

Goal scorers

Clean sheets

Disciplinary record

References

External links

FC Rostov seasons
Rostov